Cornwall Centre may refer to:

 the Cornwall Centre, a shopping mall in Regina, Saskatchewan, Canada
 the Kresen Kernow (Cornish for Cornwall Centre), an archive in Redruth, Cornwall